

Champions

Major League Baseball
World Series: New York Yankees over Brooklyn Dodgers (4-3); Don Larsen, MVP
All-Star Game, July 10 at Griffith Stadium: National League, 7-3

Other champions
College World Series: Minnesota
Japan Series: Nishitetsu Lions over Yomiuri Giants (4-2)
Little League World Series: Lions Hondo, Roswell, New Mexico
Winter Leagues
1956 Caribbean Series:  Elefantes de Cienfuegos
Cuban League:  Elefantes de Cienfuegos
Dominican Republic League: Leones del Escogido
Mexican Pacific League: Tomateros de Culiacán
Panamanian League: Chesterfield Smokers
Puerto Rican League: Criollos de Caguas
Venezuelan League: Industriales de Valencia

Awards and honors
Baseball Hall of Fame
Hank Greenberg
Joe Cronin
Most Valuable Player
National League – Don Newcombe, Brooklyn Dodgers
American League – Mickey Mantle, New York Yankees
First Cy Young Award: Don Newcombe, Brooklyn Dodgers
Rookie of the Year
National League – Frank Robinson, Cincinnati Reds
American League – Luis Aparicio, Chicago White Sox

Major League Baseball statistical leaders

1 Major League Triple Crown Batting Winner

Major league baseball final standings

American League final standings

National League final standings

Events

January

February
February   6 – Supporting the Wagner-Cashmore plan to build a $30-million downtown Brooklyn sports center, Brooklyn Dodgers owner Walter O'Malley promises to buy four million dollars worth of bonds.
February 27 – The Piedmont League disbands after 37 years in operation.

March
March 3 – In an effort to keep the New York Giants at home, Manhattan Borough president Hulan Jack makes plans for a new 110,000-seat stadium over the New York Central railroad tracks, on a 470,000-foot site stretching from 60th to 72nd streets on Manhattan's West Side. The estimated cost of $75 million for the ballpark eventually dooms the project and will be a major factor for Giants owner Horace Stoneham's decision to move the club to San Francisco in 1957.

April
April 22 – The Philadelphia Phillies manage just three hits, but one of them is a three-run home run by Ted Kazanski, as Robin Roberts wins, 3–1, over Johnny Antonelli and the New York Giants.
April 26 – Chico Carrasquel batted 2-for-4, including two runs, a grand slam and a career-high seven runs batted in, to guide the Cleveland Indians to a crushing 14–2 victory over the Kansas City Athletics. Early Wynn pitched a nine-strikeout, four-hit, two-run complete game to earn the victory, while Lou Kretlow allowed seven runs in four-plus innings to get the loss.

May
May   2 – At Wrigley Field, the New York Giants defeat the Chicago Cubs, 6-5, in a 17-inning game in which 48 players see action–25 Giants and 23 Cubs. Chicago's Don Hoak sets a National League record by striking out six times in the game, which also features a record 11 intentional walks, including two each to the Giants' Willie Mays and Wes Westrum and the Cubs' Ernie Banks.
May 12 – Carl Erskine tosses the second no-hitter of his career as the Brooklyn Dodgers blank the New York Giants, 3–0, at Ebbets Field. His first no-hitter came on June 19,  against the Chicago Cubs at Ebbets Field.
May 26 – Al Simmons died in Milwaukee, at the age of 54. A former Philadelphia Athletics outfielder as well as a three-time All-Star and two-time champion bat, Simmons posted a .334 average with 307 home runs and 1827 RBI in a 20-season major league career that included stints with six other teams besides the Athletics. Simmons was enshrined into the Hall of Fame in 1953.
May 30 – Mickey Mantle of the New York Yankees narrowly misses hitting the first home run ever hit completely out of Yankee Stadium. With Hank Bauer and Gil McDougald on base in the fifth inning of Game One of a doubleheader against the Washington Senators, Mantle, batting left-handed against Pedro Ramos, hits a towering drive above the level of the stadium roof. The home run gives the Yankees a 3-1 lead; they go on to win 4-3.

June
June 19 – In New Jersey, the city of Hoboken dedicates a plaque honoring the achievements of Alexander Cartwright in organizing early baseball games at Elysian Fields, at ceremonies marking the 100th anniversary of the first game played using modern rules.
June 21 – Jack Harshman of the Chicago White Sox defeats Connie Johnson of the Baltimore Orioles 1-0 in a game in which both pitchers throw a one-hitter.
June 27 – Chico Carrasquel went 5-for-6, including two doubles, two runs, and a game-ending RBI single in the 11th inning off Don Mossi, as the Cleveland Indians edged the Baltimore Orioles 12–11. Hal Brown was the winning pitcher in a -inning relief effort.

July
July 10 – At Griffith Stadium, home of the Washington Senators, the National League topped the American League, 7-3, in the All-Star Game. Willie Mays, Stan Musial, Ted Williams, and Mickey Mantle all hit home runs.
July 14 – At Fenway Park, Mel Parnell of the Boston Red Sox no-hits the Chicago White Sox 4-0.
July 25 – Roberto Clemente of the Pittsburgh Pirates hits the first, and so far only, walk-off inside-the park grand slam in major league history in a 9-8 win over the Chicago Cubs.

August
August   2 – Herb Score shuts out the visiting New York Yankees‚ 4–0‚ for the Cleveland Indians seventh shutout in their last 12 games. Bobby Ávila gets the Indians on board with an inside-the-park home run in the third inning. An inning later, Preston Ward and Rocky Colavito hit back-to-back home runs and one out later Chico Carrasquel homers. The four solo homers in a shutout victory sets a major league record. Yankees starter Tom Sturdivant, who gave up the four homers, is the losing pitcher.
August   8 – Robin Roberts wins his eighth straight game and his fourth in 10 days‚ as the visiting Philadelphia Phillies defeat the New York Giants‚ 9–3. Phillies shortstop Ted Kazanski lines an inside-the-park grand slam off Jim Hearn‚ just the fourth in club history to pace the attack.

September
September 25 – At Ebbets Field, Sal Maglie of the Brooklyn Dodgers no-hits the Philadelphia Phillies 5-0.
September 30 – Chicago White Sox pitcher Jim Derrington becomes the youngest pitcher in modern history to start a game. He loses to the Kansas City Athletics, 7-6, at the age of 16 years and 10 months.

October
October   8 – New York Yankees pitcher Don Larsen pitches a perfect game in Game 5 of the World Series against the Brooklyn Dodgers, in a 2-0 victory.  It is only the fourth perfect game since 1900 and sixth in the history of Major League Baseball.  To date it remains the only perfect game in baseball post-season history, and also the only no-hitter in the World Series.
October   9 – The Dodgers bounce back. Brooklyn's Clem Labine comes out of the bullpen to pitch a 1-0 victory for the Dodgers in Game 6 of the World Series. Yankee Enos Slaughter misjudges Jackie Robinson's fly ball, and Jim Gilliam scores from second base; it turned out to be Robinson's last major league hit. The series is tied at 3 games apiece.
October 10 – The New York Yankees defeat the Brooklyn Dodgers, 9-0, in Game 7 of the World Series to win their seventeenth World Series championship, four games to three. Johnny Kucks goes the distance in the victory, allowing only three hits. Yogi Berra hits a pair of 2-run home runs and Bill Skowron hits a grand slam. Don Newcombe takes the loss, his fourth in Series competition. It was the last World Series game played at Brooklyn's Ebbets Field. Yankees pitcher Don Larsen is named Most Valuable Player.
October 24 – Birdie Tebbetts of the Cincinnati Reds  is named National League Manager of the Year.
October 25 – Chicago White Sox manager Marty Marion resigns. Al López replaces him.

November
November 27:
Don Newcombe, who posted a 27-7 record with 139 strikeouts and a 3.06 ERA for the National League pennant-winning Brooklyn Dodgers, becomes the first MLB Cy Young Award winner. Only one pitcher will be selected each season for this prestigious pitching award until , when each league will name a winner.
Outfielder Charlie Peete, given a good shot at being the first black starter on the St. Louis Cardinals, is killed in a plane crash in Caracas, Venezuela. Peete, who hit .192 in 23 games for St. Louis in 1956, was returning from playing winter ball.
November 28 – The Cleveland Indians name Kerby Farrell to replace Al López as the team manager. Farrell won the Junior World Series as the pilot of the Double-A Indianapolis Indians.

December
December 1 – Outfielder Frank Robinson of the Cincinnati Reds is unanimously voted the National League Rookie of the Year. In the American League, Chicago White Sox shortstop Luis Aparicio is voted Rookie of the Year with 22 points, beating out outfielders Tito Francona of the Baltimore Orioles and Rocky Colavito of the Cleveland Indians.
December 18 – Future Hall of Fame shortstop Phil Rizzuto is hired as a broadcaster for the New York Yankees as he will hold his new position for the next four decades.

Births

January
January 10 – Dan Rohn
January 12 – Juan Bonilla
January 15 – Don Cooper
January 15 – Rance Mulliniks
January 15 – Jerry Narron
January 25 – Dale Mohorcic
January 30 – Bill Earley

February
February 1 – Geoff Combe
February 2 – Manny Sarmiento
February 4 – Chris Bando
February 9 – Mookie Wilson
February 12 – Brian Denman
February 14 – Dave Dravecky
February 15 – Ray Cosey
February 16 – Takayoshi Nakao
February 22 – Joe Lefebvre
February 24 – Eddie Murray
February 25 – Kevin Hickey
February 25 – Ed Lynch
February 29 – Jerry Fry

March
March   3 – Dennis Sherrill
March 12 – Dale Murphy
March 14 – Butch Wynegar
March 16 – Juan Espino
March 17 – Rick Lisi
March 17 – Tim Lollar
March 17 – Rod Scurry
March 23 – Mike Darr
March 23 – Ron Johnson
March 24 – Garry Templeton
March 27 – Dave Hostetler
March 30 – Jack Lazorko

April
April   1 – Mark Esser
April   3 – Darrell Jackson
April   4 – Tom Herr
April   8 – Roger Holt
April 11 – John Martin
April 12 – Jose Alvarez
April 14 – Bobby Sprowl
April 15 – Barry Cort
April 20 – Floyd Chiffer
April 20 – Tim Tolman
April 22 – Moose Haas
April 25 – Larry Pashnick

May
May   4 – Ubaldo Heredia
May   4 – Ken Oberkfell
May   5 – Ron Oester
May   6 – Alberto Lois
May 18 – Jim Farr
May 19 – Luis Salazar
May 19 – Eric Show
May 22 – Mark Brouhard
May 23 – Buck Showalter
May 27 – Bud Anderson
May 27 – Mark Clear
May 28 – Randy Martz
May 30 – Dana DeMuth
May 30 – Mike LaCoss
May 30 – Jay Loviglio

June
June   2 – Kelvin Chapman
June   3 – Julio Valdez
June   4 – Terry Kennedy
June   9 – John Fulgham
June 10 – Brad Gulden
June 10 – Randy Johnson
June 11 – Joe Alvarez
June 14 – Mike Grace
June 15 – Lance Parrish
June 20 – Larry Monroe
June 21 – Rick Sutcliffe
June 23 – Tony Johnson
June 24 – George Vukovich
June 29 – Pedro Guerrero

July
July   3 – Larry Whisenton
July   5 – Rick Lancellotti
July   6 – Jang Hyo-jo
July   7 – Terry Bevington
July   8 – Terry Puhl
July   9 – Guy Hoffman
July 10 – Vance McHenry
July 11 – Joey McLaughlin
July 12 – Bryan Clark
July 12 – Mario Soto
July 13 – Bill Caudill
July 17 – Pete Ladd
July 18 – Butch Edge
July 18 – Razor Shines
July 22 – Scott Sanderson
July 25 – Dave Patterson
July 29 – Jeff Jones
July 31 – Gordie Pladson

August
August   2 – Derek Botelho
August   2 – Roger LaFrançois
August   5 – Dave Edler
August   5 – Dave Rozema
August   8 – Cliff Speck
August 12 – Bobby Bonner
August 19 – Ron Roenicke
August 19 – Kevin Saucier
August 20 – Joel Finch
August 21 – John Henry Johnson
August 22 – Mark Gilbert
August 22 – Paul Molitor
August 24 – Tony Bernazard
August 24 – Neil Fiala
August 26 – George Bjorkman
August 27 – Rick Steirer
August 30 – Steve Baker
August 30 – Scott Brown
August 30 – Roger Erickson
August 30 – Willie Mueller

September
September 2 – Fred Howard
September 5 – Tom Hallion
September 7 – Orlando Sánchez
September 12 – Mark Thurmond
September 15 – John Pacella
September 17 – Thad Bosley
September 20 – Mike Gates
September 22 – Hiromichi Ishige
September 24 – Hubie Brooks
September 29 – Mark Calvert

October
October 1 – Vance Law
October 2 – Jeff Doyle
October 3 – Bob Kearney
October 4 – Genji Kaku
October 4 – Charlie Leibrandt
October 6 – George Riley
October 7 – Rudy Law
October 8 – Jeff Lahti
October 12 – Steve Shirley
October 13 – Andy Beene
October 16 – Dan Firova
October 19 – Germán Barranca
October 22 – Frank DiPino
October 23 – Luis Silverio
October 24 – Gary Serum
October 25 – Andy McGaffigan

November
November   1 – Gary Redus
November   2 – Gary Hargis
November   3 – Bob Welch
November 11 – Jeff Byrd
November 11 – Scott Loucks
November 12 – Jody Davis
November 19 – Dickie Noles
November 25 – Dave Baker
November 26 – Ron Meridith
November 26 – Bob Walk
November 29 – Rick Anderson
November 29 – Joe Price
November 30 – Dave Engle

December
December   1 – Tom Filer
December   3 – Mark Bradley
December   4 – Bárbaro Garbey
December   5 – Dave Hudgens
December   5 – Bill Swaggerty
December   7 – Ozzie Virgil
December   8 – Alan Wirth
December   9 – Eric Wilkins
December 10 – Darrell Woodard
December 12 – Steve Farr
December 13 – Dale Berra
December 13 – Jon Perlman
December 16 – Rick Sofield
December 19 – Stan Cliburn
December 19 – Stew Cliburn
December 19 – Tom Lawless
December 22 – Gary Cooper
December 22 – Dave Schmidt
December 23 – Bert Bradley
December 25 – Wallace Johnson
December 25 – Charlie Lea
December 29 – Dave Ford

Deaths

January
January   4 – John Beckwith, 55, All-Star shortstop and manager in the Negro leagues, who spent over 20 years in baseball, ranking among the Negro leagues' career leaders in batting average, home runs, RBI and slugging percentage.
January   7 – Davey Claire, 58, shortstop who appeared in three games for the Detroit Tigers in 1920.
January 10 – Algie McBride, 86, outfielder for the Chicago Colts, Cincinnati Reds, and New York Giants from 1896 to 1901.
January 22 − Ralph Mitterling, 65, outfielder for the Philadelphia Athletics during the 1916 season. 
January 23 – Billy Evans, 71, youngest umpire in MLB history when he joining the American League staff in 1906 at age 22; officiated in six World Series between 1909 and 1923; in 1927 retired from umpiring and became a front office executive, serving as general manager of the Cleveland Indians (1927–1935) and Detroit Tigers (1946–1951).
January 26 – Dave Howard, 66, second baseman who played with the Washington Senators in the 1912 season and for the Brooklyn Tip-Tops in 1915.
January 31 – Buck Weaver, 65, shortstop and third baseman who played his entire career for the Chicago White Sox from 1912 to 1920, also a member of the 1917 World Series champion White Sox, then was one of the eight players banned from the Major Leagues for his connection to the 1919 Black Sox scandal.

February
February   8 – Roy Hitt, 71, pitcher for the 1907 Cincinnati Reds.
February   8 – Tom Hughes, 77, pitcher for the Chicago Orphans at the turn of the 20th century as well as one of the first World Series pitchers ever, in 1903, with the Boston Americans champion team.
February   8 – Connie Mack, 93, whose 65 years in baseball began as a catcher with the Washington Nationals in 1886, later a manager and owner of the Philadelphia Athletics from 1901 through 1950, retiring with nine American League pennants, five World Series titles and  a record 3,731 victories – a feat that is unlikely to ever be matched, being inducted to the Hall of Fame in 1937.
February 11 – Joseph Myers, 73, pitcher for the Philadelphia Athletics during the 1905 season.
February 13 – Fred Holmes, 77, first baseman and catcher who played with the New York Highlanders in the 1904 season and for the Chicago Cubs in 1904.
February 14 – Bill Bishop, 55, pitcher who played for the Philadelphia Athletics during the 1921 season. 
February 17 – Kip Selbach, 83, solid defensive outfielder who played for six different teams in a span of 13 seasons from 1894–1906, posting an overall batting line of .293/.377/.412 and 334 stolen bases, while leading the National League with 22 triples in 1895.
February 19 – Ray Demmitt, 72, backup outfielder who played with five teams in part of seven seasons spanning 1909–1919.
February 23 – Pete Loos, 77, pitcher for the Philadelphia Athletics of the American League in its 1901 season.
February 25 – Jack Lewis, 72, second baseman who played with the Boston Red Sox in 1911 and for the Pittsburgh Rebels of the outlaw Federal League from 1914 to 1915.

March
March   1 – Ed Heusser, 46, pitcher for four teams in nine seasons between 1935 and 1948, who led the National League pitchers with a 2.38 ERA in 1944.
March   1 – Walt Miller, 72, pitcher who appeared in three games for the Brooklyn Dodgers in the 1911 season. 
March   2 – Fred Merkle, 67, slugging first baseman and part-time outfielder who was in the major leagues from 1907 through 1926, playing with the New York Giants, Brooklyn Dodgers, Chicago Cubs and New York Yankees, being best remembered for his famous and controversial baserunning blunder as a 19-year rookie in 1908 that likely cost the Giants the National League pennant.
March   4 – Frank Kelliher, 56, pinch-hitter who appeared in just one game with the Washington Senators in 1919. 
March   5 – Bruce Ogrodowski, 44, backup catcher for the St. Louis Cardinals in part of two seasons from 1936–1937.
March   6 – Joe Berger, 69, part-time infielder for the Chicago White Sox in the 1913 and 1914 seasons.
March   7 – Shorty Desjardien, 62, pitcher for the Cleveland  Indians in 1916, who is regarded as one of the best all-around athletes ever produced by the University of Chicago, while playing on Western Conference championship teams in both football and baseball, and competing also in  basketball and track and field tournaments.  
March 10 – Solly Hofman, 73, an above-average center fielder and one of the Deadball Era's finest utility men, who spent 14 seasons with five Major League teams between 1903 and 1916, while garnering attention as a timely hitter, his speed on the bases, and spectacular catches in outfield.
March 14 – Lena Styles, 56, catcher who played with the Philadelphia Athletics and Cincinnati Reds over parts of five seasons from 1919–1931.
March 20 – Ed Smith, 77,  pitcher for the St. Louis Browns during the 1906 season.

April
April   3 – Dolly Gray, 77, pitcher who played from 1909 to 1911 for the Washington Senators.
April   3 – Clay Roe, 52, pitcher for the 1923 Washington Senators.
April   5 – Tommy Taylor, 63, third baseman who played his only Major League season with the 1924 World Series champion Washington Senators.
April   9 – John Quinn, 70, backup catcher for the 1911 Philadelphia Phillies.
April 10 – Ginger Beaumont,79 
April 10 – Bill Brady, 66, relief pitcher for the 1912 Boston Braves.
April 16 – George Puccinelli, 48, outfielder who played for the St. Louis Cardinals, St. Louis Browns and Philadelphia Athletics over parts of four seasons spanning 1930–1936.
April 18 – Claude Davidson, 59, second baseman in 33 total games for 1918 Philadelphia Athletics and 1919 Washington Senators; president of post-World War II New England League.
April 18 – John Heydler, 86, ninth full-time president of the National League (1916–1934); former umpire and sportswriter.

April 18 – Patsy O'Rourke, 75, shortstop for the 1908 St. Louis Cardinals.
April 20 – Sam Brenegan, 65, backup batcher for the 1914 Pittsburgh Pirates.
April 26 – Cliff Blankenship, 76, catcher and first baseman who played with the Cincinnati Reds in 1905 and for the Washington Senators in 1907 and 1909.

May
May   3 – Karl Kolseth, 63,  first baseman who played in 1915 for the Baltimore Terrapins of the Federal League.
May   4 – Gus Dorner, 79, pitcher for the Boston Beaneaters, Cincinnati Reds and Cleveland Naps in a span of six seasons between 1902 and 1909.
May   5 – John Godwin, 79, infield/outfield utility man for the Boston Americans in the 1905 and 1906 seasons.
May   6 – Harry Ostdiek, 75, backup catcher who played with the Cleveland Naps in the 1904 season and for the Boston Red Sox in 1908.
May   7 – Tommy Atkins, 68, pitcher who played from 1909 to 1910 for the Philadelphia Athletics.
May 10 – Jimmy Slagle, 82, outfielder who played for four National League clubs in 10 seasons from 1899–1908, winning two World Series rings with the Chicago Cubs in 1907 and 1908.
May 22 – Harry Howell, 79, notorious spitballer who pitched with six teams from 1898 to 1910, helping the Brooklyn Superbas win the 1900 National League pennant and becoming  the best pitcher of the St. Louis Browns (now Baltimore Orioles) during the Deadball Era, establishing a franchise record for career ERA (2.06) that has never been equaled.
May 27 – Freddy Sale, 54, pitcher who appeared in just one game with the Pittsburgh Pirates in 1924.
May 26 – Al Simmons, 54, slugging Hall of Fame left fielder for seven clubs from 1924–1944, most prominently for Connie Mack and his fearsome Philadelphia Athletics of the late 1920s and early 1930s, who topped the American League with a .387 batting average, 24 home runs and 129 runs batted in and 253 hits in 1925, expanding his production in the next three seasons with averages of .341, a league-best .392, and .351, driving in 109, 108 and 107 runs, respectively, while guiding the Athletics to the American League pennant from 1929 through 1931, and World Series titles the first two of those years, ending his career with a .334 batting average, 2,927 hits, 307 home runs and 1,827 RBI, all with an unconventional batting stance that earned him the nickname 'Bucketfoot Al' because his stride took him toward third base.

June
June   2 – Tony Parisse, 44, catcher for wartime Philadelphia Athletics (1943–1944) who played in ten career MLB games.
June   2 – Denny Sullivan

June   3 – Roxy Walters, 63, catcher who played in 498 games over 11 seasons (1915–1925) for the New York Yankees, Boston Red Sox and Cleveland Indians.
June 15 – Scotty Ingerton,
June 19 – John Monroe,
June 22 – Ed Forsythe,

July
July   2 – Roy Wilkinson,
July   9 – Budd Ryan, 70, catcher in 166 total games for 1912–1913 Cleveland Naps; longtime Pacific Coast League player and manager.
July 10 – Joe Giard, 56, left-handed pitcher who worked in 68 games for 1925–1926 St. Louis Browns and 1927 New York Yankees.
July 13 – Glenn Liebhardt,
July 18 – Hank Perry,
July 25 – John Kane, 56, infielder who played in 14 games in September 1925 for the Chicago White Sox.
July 26 – Dad Clark,
July 30 – Tommy Sewell,

August
August   5 – Paddy Siglin,
August   7 – Hughie Tate,
August 12 – Warren Miller,
August 14 – Frank Dupee,
August 24 – Art Fromme, 72, pitcher for the St. Louis Cardinals, Cincinnati Reds and New York Giants between 1906 and 1915.
August 31 – Frank Watt,

September
September   4 – Pat Ragan, 72, pitcher who appeared for seven big-league teams (primarily Brooklyn and Boston of the National League) in 11 seasons spanning 1909 to 1923; went 77–104 with a 2.99 career ERA in 283 career gams pitched.
September   6 – Stubby Magner,
September 10 – Eddie Brown, 65, outfielder who batted .303 in 790 MLB games with New York Giants (1920–1921), Brooklyn Robins (1924–1925) and Boston Braves (1926–1928); led National League in hits, with 201, in 1926.
September 11 – Marty Herrmann,
September 12 – Tod Sloan,
September 18 – Jim Rutherford,
September 20 – Tom Gastall, 24, "bonus baby" catcher for 1955–1956 Baltimore Orioles; one day after playing in his 52nd career game, he was killed when the single-engine aircraft he was piloting crashed into Chesapeake Bay.
 
September 22 – Jesse Tannehill, 82, 6-time winner of 20 games with the Pittsburgh Pirates and Boston Red Sox.
September 24 – Walt Marbet
September 25 – John McMakin

October
October   4 – Jake Gettman,
October   7 – Tom Stouch,
October 13 – George Dumont, 60, pitcher for the Washington Senators and Boston Red Sox between 1915 and 1919.
October 22 – Frank Scheibeck,
October 22 – John Jackson,
October 26 – Red Nelson,
October 30 – Dick Midkiff, 42,  pitcher for the 1938 Boston Red Sox.
October 31 – John Leighton,

November
November   1 – Limb McKenry, 68, pitcher for the Cincinnati Reds in 1915 and 1916.
November   3 – John Jones, 55, outfielder for the Philadelphia Athletics in 1923 and 1932.
November   9 – Lem Hunter, 93, appeared in one game for the Cleveland Blues in 1883.
November 14 – Ed Hilley, 77, third baseman for the 1903 Philadelphia Athletics.
November 20 – Bub Kuhn, 57, pitched a single inning for the 1924 Cleveland Indians.
November 22 – Roy Carlyle, 55, played outfield for three American League teams in the 1920s.
November 27 – Charlie Peete, 27, St. Louis Cardinals outfielder, in a plane crash in Venezuela while playing winter baseball.
November 30 – John Shea, 59, pitcher for the 1928 Boston Red Sox.

December
December 10 – Grace Comiskey, 63, owner of the Chicago White Sox from July 18, 1939 until her death.
December 12 – Bill Malarkey,
December 16 – Ziggy Sears, 64, National League umpire from 1934 through 1945; worked 1935 and 1944 World Series, 1938 and 1944 All-Star Games, and 1,649 NL contests.
December 17 – Ona Dodd,
December 24 – Del Howard

December 27 – Hob Hiller

Sources

External links

Baseball Almanac - Major League Baseball Players Who Were Born in 1956
Baseball Almanac - Major League Baseball Players Who Died in 1956
Baseball Reference - 1956 MLB Season Summary  
ESPN - 1956 MLB Season History